Mark Whitfield (born October 6, 1966) is an American jazz guitarist.

Life and career
Whitfield was born in Lindenhurst, New York. He has worked with Jack McDuff, Jimmy Smith, Courtney Pine, Nicholas Payton, and Chris Botti.

In 2000, Whitfield released an instructional guitar video titled Mark Whitfield: Star Licks Master Sessions for Star Licks Productions. In 2017, he shot a series of instructional videos entitled Mark Whitfield: Land the Gig.

Discography

As leader
 The Marksman (Warner Bros., 1990)
 Patrice (Warner Bros., 1991)
 Mark Whitfield (Warner Bros., 1993)
 True Blue (Verve, 1994)
 7th Ave. Stroll (Verve, 1995)
 Forever Love (Verve, 1997)
 Soul Conversation [with JK] (Transparent Music, 2000)
 Raw [live] (Transparent Music, 2000)
 Trio Paradise (Vega [jp], 2004)
 Mark Whitfield Featuring Panther (Dirty Soap, 2005)
 Mark Whitfield & The Groove Masters (Vega [jp], 2006)
 Songs of Wonder (Marksman, 2009)	
 Grace (Marksman, 2016)
 Live & Uncut (Chesky, 2017)

As sideman
 Carl Allen, Testimonial (Atlantic, 1995)
 Sean Ardoin, Sean Ardoin 'n' ZydeKool (ZydeKool Records, 1999)
 Teodross Avery, My Generation (Impulse!, 1996)
 Beta Radio, Seven Sisters (Beta Radio, 2011)
 Pat Bianchi, East Coast Roots (Jazzed Media, 2006)
 Mary J. Blige, No More Drama (MCA, 2001)
 Chris Botti, In Boston (Decca, 2009)
 D'Angelo, Brown Sugar (EMI, 1995)
 Michael Dease, Grace (Jazz Legacy Productions, 2010)
 Russell Gunn, Blue On the D.L. (HighNote, 2002)
 Donald Harrison, Full Circle (Sweet Basil, 1990)
 Donald Harrison/Terence Blanchard, Black Pearl (Columbia, 1988)
 Conrad Herwig, Obligation (Criss Cross, 2005)
 Javon Jackson, Easy Does It (Palmetto, 2003)
 Javon Jackson, Have You Heard (Palmetto, 2005)
 Hector Martignon, Refugee (Zoho, 2007)
 Peter Martin, New Stars from New Orleans (Paddle Wheel [Japan], 1994)
 Christian McBride, Fingerpainting (Verve, 1997)
 Christian McBride, For Jimmy, Wes and Oliver (Mack Avenue, 2020)
 Brother Jack McDuff, Bringin' It Home (Concord Jazz, 1999)
 Sarah McKenzie, Paris in the Rain (Impulse!, 2017)
 Jason Miles, To Grover with Love (ARTizen, 2006)
 Nicholas Payton, From This Moment (Verve, 1995)
 Courtney Pine, Modern Day Jazz Stories (Verve, 1995)
 Courtney Pine, Underground (Verve, 1997)
 Jimmy Smith, Damn! (Verve, 1995)
 Jimmy Smith, Angel Eyes: Ballads & Slow Jams (Verve, 1996)
 Special EFX, Here to Stay (JVC, 1997)
 Sy Smith, Sometimes a Rose Will Grow in Concrete (Psyko!, 2018)
 Camille Thurman, Inside the Moment (Chesky, 2017)
 Cedar Walton, Roots (Astor Place, 1999)
 Ernie Watts, The Long Road Home (JVC, 1996)
 James Williams, Classic Encounters! (DIW [Japan], 2000)
 Joe Zawinul Syndicate/Mark Whitfield Quartet/Wallace Roney Quartet, A-013 [live] (Jazz A Go-Go [Poland], 1995)

References

1966 births
Living people
20th-century American guitarists
21st-century American guitarists
American jazz guitarists
Hard bop guitarists
Soul-jazz guitarists
People from Lindenhurst, New York
Jazz musicians from New York (state)